Maisonnay is a commune in the Deux-Sèvres department in western France.

See also
 TV Mast Niort-Maisonnay
Communes of the Deux-Sèvres department

References

Communes of Deux-Sèvres